José Medina may refer to:

 Jose Medina, American politician
 José Medina (cyclist) (born 1973), Chilean track and road cyclist
 José Medina (Brazilian filmmaker) (1894–1980), Brazilian director and writer, known for Carlitinhos, Do Rio a São Paulo Para Casar, and Perversidade
 José Medina (sport shooter), see Philippines at the 1984 Summer Olympics#Shooting
 José Medina (weightlifter) (born 1970), Venezuelan weightlifter
 José Hugo Medina (born 1945), Argentinian footballer with Estudiantes de La Plata, see 1968 Intercontinental Cup
 José María Medina (1826–1878), temporarily President of Honduras
 José Ramón Medina (1921–2010), Venezuelan lawyer, writer, poet and politician
 José Toribio Medina (1852–1930), Chilean bibliographer, writer and historian
 José Miguel Medina, Mexican footballer
 José Antonio Medina (born 1996), Mexican footballer
 José Medina (philosopher), philosopher
 José Medina (swimmer) (born 1965), Mexican swimmer